Alfonso Manrique (1560 – 27 September 1612) was a Roman Catholic prelate who served as Archbishop of Burgos (1604–1612).

Biography
Alfonso Manrique was born in Spain in 1560.
On 20 October 1604, he was appointed during the papacy of Pope Clement VIII as Archbishop of Burgos.
On 24 October 1604, he was consecrated bishop by Pietro Aldobrandini, Archbishop of Ravenna, with Fabio Biondi, Titular Patriarch of Jerusalem, and Tommaso Lapis, Bishop of Fano, serving as co-consecrators.
He served as Archbishop of Burgos until his death on 27 September 1612.
While bishop, he was the principal consecrator of Alonso Orozco Enriquez de Armendáriz Castellanos y Toledo, Auxiliary Bishop of Burgos and Titular Bishop of Sidon (1605).

References

External links and additional sources
 (for Chronology of Bishops) 
 (for Chronology of Bishops) 

17th-century Roman Catholic bishops in Spain
Bishops appointed by Pope Clement VIII
1560 births
1612 deaths